Ilean Almaguer (() Born Ilean Almaguer Ochoa on December 20, 1984, in Tuxtla Gutiérrez, Chiapas, Mexico) ís a Mexican actress.

Life

She is best known for her role in the Mexican soap opera "Atrévete a Soñar" playing Catalina (Cata) part of the Populares group. She has also starred in "La Rosa de Guadalupe" series. She is also a cast member of the novela Rafaela as Alicia De La Vega. She has starred in shows such as "Mujer, Casos de la Vida Real" She also appeared in "Rafaela" and "Gitanas".

Also is currently filming "El Quinto Mandamiento". She also played Hannah "Jana" in Un refugio para el amor in 2012. In 2013 she married Colombian actor Lucas Velásquez.

Filmography

References

External links

Telemundo bio (Spanish)

1984 births
Living people
Mexican child actresses
Mexican telenovela actresses
Mexican television actresses
21st-century Mexican actresses
Actresses from Chiapas
People from Tuxtla Gutiérrez